Chimps: So Like Us is a 1990 American short documentary film about chimpanzees and the work of Jane Goodall directed by Kirk Simon and Karen Goodman. It was nominated for an Academy Award for Best Documentary Short. The half-hour film, shot on location in New York, Arizona and Tanzania. The film has been broadcast extensively on HBO.

References

External links

1990 films
1990 independent films
1990s short documentary films
American short documentary films
American independent films
Films about apes
Jane Goodall
1990s English-language films
1990s American films